Fortune Plaza is located in central business district of Chaoyang, Beijing, nearby Kerry center; China World Trade Center and the CCTV Headquarters building. It is a mixed use development with a total construction area of 720,000 square meters, covering 92,100 square meters of land.

It contains Fortune Plaza 1 (2006) as phase 1 and Fortune Heights (2008) as phase 2  and  Fortune Financial Center (2014) as phase 3.

Gallery

See also

 List of tallest buildings in the world
 List of tallest buildings in Beijing

References

External links
Emporis.com – Fortune Plaza Office Building 1
SkycraperPage.com – Fortune Plaza Office Building 1

Skyscraper office buildings in Beijing
Buildings and structures in Chaoyang District, Beijing